Pidzamche railway station (also known as Lviv-Pidzamche) is a railway station of the Lviv Railways located in Lviv, 7 km away from the city's main railway terminal. Officially considered a freight station, it is nevertheless served by all passing suburban trains, as well as several long-distance trains.

History 
The station has got its name from the Lviv High Castle hill at the foot of which the station is located. Part of the station is built on top of a former cemetery. 

The original station building was damaged in the Polish–Ukrainian War of 1918–1919, and even more so in World War II. The remains of the original building now house the railway offices, whereas the current two-storey passenger hall with the big central avant-corps is a post-WWII reconstruction based on the original designs.

A memorial plaque on the station building commemorates the bodies of 602 victims of Soviet famine of 1946–47 which were discovered near the station during reconstruction works in the 2000s.

Operations 
Between 1 December 2009 and 15 June 2010, Pidzamche railway station was one of the two termini of Lviv City Railbus, which was then discontinued for unprofitability.

Until 2016, none of the passing long-distance trains served the station. Over 2016, the schedules of three long-distance trains were amended to include a stop at Pidzamche:  № 92/91 (Lviv — Kyiv), № 705/706 (Kyiv — Przemyśl), and № 743/744 (Lviv — Darnytsia). On 12 July 2017, seven more long-distance trains were scheduled to stop at the station.

Since 2017, the station is served by six daily long-distance trains (Lviv — Odessa, Dnipro — Truskavets, Lviv — Kyiv, Kyiv — Przemyśl, Lviv — Darnytsia railway station) and three which run every other day (Lviv — Novooleksiivka and Lviv — Kharkiv). In addition to the long-distance trains, the station is served by four daily regional services (Lviv — Rivne and Lviv — Kivertsi).

References 

Lviv Railways stations
Railway stations in Lviv Oblast